Florian Dick (born 9 November 1984) is a German professional football defender.

Dick is a youth international for Germany at U20 level.

References

External links
 
 

1984 births
Living people
People from Bruchsal
Sportspeople from Karlsruhe (region)
Association football defenders
German footballers
Germany youth international footballers
Karlsruher SC players
Karlsruher SC II players
1. FC Kaiserslautern players
Arminia Bielefeld players
Bundesliga players
2. Bundesliga players
3. Liga players
Footballers from Baden-Württemberg